Holy Cross Church is a Catholic church on the Crumlin Road in Ardoyne,Belfast.

References

External links
Holy Cross, Belfast city - Catholic Parish Registers at National Library of Ireland

Roman Catholic churches in Belfast